Beidou-3 M1 is one of a pair of two Chinese navigation satellites launched in November 2017 as part of the BeiDou satellite navigation system. It was launched with BeiDou-3 M2.

BeiDou-3 M1/M2 were launched from LC2 at Xichang Satellite Launch Center 64 kilometres northwest of Xichang, Liangshan Yi Autonomous Prefecture in Sichuan, China A Long March 3B carrier rocket with a YZ-1 upper stage was used to perform the launch which took place at 11:45 UTC on 5 November 2017. The launch successfully placed the satellites into Medium Earth orbit. It later received the international designator 2017-069A. The United States Space Command assigned it the Satellite Catalog Number 43001.

It is in orbital plane A in orbital slot 7.

See also

List of BeiDou satellites
List of Long March launches

References

BeiDou satellites
Spacecraft launched in 2017
Satellites of China
2017 in China